Peter Maltitz Anderson (30 September 1879, Heilbron, Orange Free State – 5 November 1954 ) was a South African mining engineer.

He was president of the South African Chamber of Mines in 1925, 1930, 1933, 1937 and 1940/1.

Union Corporation 
He was managing director of the Union Corporation Ltd.

Personal life 
He received an honorary Doctorate of Science in Engineering from the University of the Witwatersrand in 1930. He was married to Evelyn Elizabeth Anderson (née Gatheral) and had five children. He named the town of Evander after her.

Anderson died in Johannesburg.

References 

1879 births
1954 deaths
People from Heilbron
South African mining engineers
20th-century South African engineers